Laura Rollins (born 20 December) is a British-Bajan actress, known for portraying the role of Ayesha Lee on the BBC soap opera Doctors, a role which she played from September 2014 to June 2020. For her portrayal of Ayesha, she won the award for Best Female Dramatic Performance at the RTS Midlands Awards. Since leaving Doctors, Rollins has appeared in various television series including Innocent and Miss Scarlet and The Duke.

Life and career
Rollins began her acting training at the Carlton Junior Television Workshop, and while studying there, she made her television debut on the children's series The Demon Headmaster at the age of 10. She was also featured in various advertisements and performed at the British Academy Children's Awards. After leaving the workshop, Rollins began attending the University of Leeds, studying English and Theatre. She then did a one-year course at Arts Educational Schools in London. In 1999, she starred in Welcome To Orty Fou as Caroline Saunders.

In 2013, Rollins appeared in the feature film Communion, and in 2014, she auditioned for a role in the BBC soap opera Doctors. She took a sick day from work to attend the audition, and after a two-week process, she was given the role of Ayesha Lee. Whilst on the series, Rollins' character's storylines included romances with co-workers Sid Vere (Ashley Rice) and Bear Sylvester (Dex Lee), facing prejudice due to her race and troubled upbringing, and struggling with her mother's alcoholism and subsequent death, for which she won a Royal Television Society award for Best Female Dramatic Performance. She then starred in the 2016 short film From Noya, and the 2018 short film Shining Tor, for which she won Best Performance for at the 2019 Short Film Awards. In January 2020, Rollins appeared in an episode of the BBC crime drama Silent Witness as Kate Langley. On 20 May 2020, it was announced that Rollins would be leaving Doctors after six years in the role of Ayesha. Her final scenes aired on 5 June 2020. In 2021, she starred in the second series of the ITV drama Innocent. Then in 2022, she made appearances in Father Brown and Miss Scarlet and The Duke.

Filmography

Awards and nominations

References

External links
 
 

1988 births
Actresses from Birmingham, West Midlands
Black British actresses
English child actresses
English film actresses
English soap opera actresses
English television actresses
Living people
People educated at the Arts Educational Schools